Daimy Deflem (born 4 May 1994) is a Belgian professional football player who currently plays for Diegem as a forward.

Club career 

Deflem signed a two-year contract with Waasland-Beveren in May 2014, coming from Woluwe-Zaventem. He made his top flight debut at 26 July 2014 against Club Brugge in a 0-2 home defeat. He replaced Hrvoje Čale after 75 minutes.

References

External links

Daimy Deflem at Footballdatabase

1994 births
Living people
Belgian footballers
Belgian Pro League players
K.V.K. Tienen-Hageland players
S.K. Beveren players
K.S.K. Heist players
K.F.C. Diest players
K. Diegem Sport players
People from Tienen
Association football forwards
Footballers from Flemish Brabant